Fausto Masnada (born 6 November 1993 in Bergamo) is an Italian cyclist, who currently rides for UCI WorldTeam . In May 2019, he was named in the start list for the 2019 Giro d'Italia, and went on to win stage 6 of the race.

Major results

2012
 6th Overall Giro della Valle d'Aosta
2014
 7th Ruota d'Oro
2015
 1st Piccolo Giro di Lombardia
 2nd Coppa Collecchio
 9th Overall Giro del Friuli-Venezia Giulia
2016
 1st Giro del Medio Brenta
2017
 2nd Overall Tour du Jura
 3rd Overall Tour of Turkey
 7th Giro dell'Appennino
2018
 1st  Overall Tour of Hainan
1st Stage 8
 1st  Mountains classification, Tour of Slovenia
 3rd Giro dell'Appennino
 6th Overall Settimana Internazionale di Coppi e Bartali
 9th Overall Tour de Hongrie
 10th Trofeo Laigueglia
2019
 1st Stage 6 Giro d'Italia
 2nd Giro dell'Appennino
 3rd Overall Giro di Sicilia
1st  Mountains classification
 5th Overall Tour of the Alps
1st Stages 3 & 5
 7th Overall Tour of Slovenia
 8th Coppa Agostoni
 8th Tokyo 2020 Test Event
2020
 6th Overall Tirreno–Adriatico
 9th Overall Giro d'Italia
 9th Overall Tour des Alpes-Maritimes et du Var
2021
 2nd Road race, National Road Championships
 2nd Giro di Lombardia
 3rd Overall Tour de Romandie
 3rd Coppa Bernocchi
 8th Milano–Torino
 10th Overall UAE Tour
2022
 2nd Overall Tour of Oman
1st Stage 4

General classification results timeline

References

External links

1993 births
Living people
Italian male cyclists
Italian Giro d'Italia stage winners
Cyclists from Bergamo